BTAA may refer to:
Big Ten Academic Alliance
Black Theater Alliance Awards
British Television Advertising Awards
British Travelgoods and Accessories Association